Dźwierszno Wielkie  is a village in the administrative district of Gmina Łobżenica, within Piła County, Greater Poland Voivodeship, in west-central Poland.

References

Villages in Piła County